The Brazilian monitor Pará was the lead ship of the  river monitors built for the Brazilian Navy during the Paraguayan War in the late 1860s. Pará participated in the Passagem de Humaitá in February 1868 and provided fire support for the army for the rest of the war. The ship was assigned to the Mato Grosso Flotilla after the war. Pará was disarmed and discarded in 1884.

Design and description
The Pará-class monitors were designed to meet the need of the Brazilian Navy for small, shallow-draft armored ships capable of withstanding heavy fire. The monitor configuration was chosen as a turreted design did not have the same problems engaging enemy ships and fortifications as did the casemate ironclads already in Brazilian service. The oblong gun turret sat on a circular platform that had a central pivot. It was rotated by four men via a system of gears; 2.25 minutes were required for a full 360° rotation. A bronze ram was fitted to these ships as well. The hull was sheathed with Muntz metal to reduce biofouling.

With only  of freeboard they had to be towed between Rio de Janeiro and their area of operations. Their crew numbered 43 officers and men.

Propulsion
The Pará-class ships had two direct-acting steam engines, each driving a single  propeller. The ships carried enough coal for one day's steaming.

Armament
Pará carried a single 70-pounder Whitworth rifled muzzle loader (RML) in her gun turret. The 70-pounder gun had a maximum elevation of 15°. Most unusually the gun's Brazilian-designed iron carriage was designed to pivot vertically at the muzzle; this was done to minimize the size of the gunport through which splinters and shells could enter.

Armor
The hull of the Pará-class ships was made from three layers of wood that alternated in orientation.

The gun turret was shaped like a rectangle with rounded corners. Its roof and the exposed portions of the platform it rested upon were protected by 12.7 millimeters of armor. The armored pilothouse was positioned ahead of the turret.

Service
Pará was laid down at the Arsenal de Marinha da Côrte in Rio de Janeiro on 8 December 1866, during the Paraguayan War, which saw Argentina and Brazil allied against Paraguay. She was launched on 21 May 1867 and commissioned on 15 June 1867. She was towed to the Río de la Plata on 20 June 1867 and steamed up the Paraná River, although her passage further north was barred by the Paraguayan fortifications at Humaitá. On 19 February 1868 six Brazilian ironclads, including Pará, sailed past Humaitá at night. The monitor had to be beached after passing the fortress to prevent her from sinking. Pará was repaired by 27 February when she joined a squadron dispatched to capture the town of Laureles. On 17 May 1869 she joined a blockading squadron on the Jejuy and Araguaya Rivers. After the war Pará was assigned to the newly formed Mato Grosso Flotilla. She was disarmed and discarded on 10 December 1884 at Ladário.

Footnotes

References

External links
 Brief history of Pará 

Ships built in Brazil
1867 ships
Pará-class monitors
Maritime incidents in February 1868